South Africa competed with only one athlete, alpine skier Connor Wilson, at the 2018 Winter Olympics in Pyeongchang, South Korea. The country returned to the Winter Olympics after missing the 2014 Winter Olympics.

Competitors
The following is the list of number of competitors participating in the South African delegation per sport.

Alpine skiing 

South Africa qualified one male athlete.

See also
South Africa at the 2018 Summer Youth Olympics

References

Nations at the 2018 Winter Olympics
2018
2018 in South African sport